Achaeans are the inhabitants of Achaea in Greece. However, the meaning of Achaea changed during the course of Ancient history, and thus Achaeans may refer to:

Achaeans (Homer), a name used by Homer in the Iliad for Mycenaean-era Greeks in general.
Achaeans (tribe), one of the major tribes of Greece according to the Hesiodic foundation myth
Achaea (ancient region), historical inhabitants, during the Archaic and Classical periods, of the Peloponnesian region of Achaea
Achaea Phthiotis, a region of ancient Thessaly
Achaean League
Achaea, the modern Greek administrative unit

See also
Achaea (disambiguation)